Emma V Corney (born 15 September 2003) is an English cricketer who currently plays for Devon and Western Storm. An all-rounder, she is a right-handed batter and right-arm medium bowler.

Early life
Corney was born on 15 September 2003. Her hometown is Exmouth, Devon.

Domestic career
Corney made her county debut for Devon in 2019, against Wales. In her fourth match, she hit her maiden county half-century, scoring 55 against Middlesex. She was Devon's leading run-scorer in the 2021 Women's Twenty20 Cup, with 165 runs including her Twenty20 high score of 44, as well as taking 2 wickets.

In 2020, Corney played for Western Storm in the Rachael Heyhoe Flint Trophy. She appeared in all six matches, taking two wickets with a best of 1/16 against Sunrisers. She played two matches for the side in 2021, as well as being part of the Academy squad throughout the season. In 2022, she played two matches for Western Storm, both in the Rachael Heyhoe Flint Trophy, scoring 52 runs in two innings.

References

External links

2003 births
Living people
Place of birth missing (living people)
Devon women cricketers
Western Storm cricketers